Ullensaker/Kisa IL, commonly referred to as Ull/Kisa, is a Norwegian sports club from Jessheim in Ullensaker. Founded in 1894, it has sections for association football, team handball and athletics.

General history 
The club was founded on 15 December 1894. After the Second World War it incorporated the AIF club Ullensaker AIL, founded 1932.

Ull/Kisa plays with a yellow shirt and green shorts. In football, this is completed with yellow stockings.

Athletics 
The club has had some Norwegian champions, mostly within running events. An early medal winner was Svein Skolt, who took a national bronze medal in the steeplechase in 1951. A few years later, Berit Dønnum took a double 800 metres title in 1962 and 1963. Tove Dønnum took three straight high jump titles in 1961, 1962 and 1963—and Anne-Mette Olsen took a bronze in 1972.

Thomas Roth became 800 metres champion in 2010 and took the bronze in 2009. Roth also competed in the 2011 European Indoor Championships. Tor-Erik Nyquist took three marathon silvers in 1995, 1996 and 1997 and a half marathon silver in 1999.

Pål Berntzen became javelin champion in 1992. The decathlete Jo Henning Hals-Nilssen took a national bronze in 1992. The decathlete Tom Erik Olsen won a national silver medal in the hurdles in 1995. He later won several national titles for other clubs. Inger Birgitte Reppe took a hurdles bronze in 1988. Else Opsahl, Astrid Willersrud and Ragnhild Sundby won medals in shot put in the 1960s, and Runa Nordahl won a javelin bronze in 1975.

Football 
The men's football team currently plays in the Norwegian Second Division, the third tier in the Norwegian football league system.

Its stadium, Jessheim stadion, is quite dilapidated. Therefore, the club is planning a new stadium that will take between 1000-5000 spectators.

In May 2009 Ull/Kisa performed well in the 2009 Norwegian Football Cup, upsetting Sandefjord Fotball 1–0 in the second round. The goal was scored by Mats Jarnbjo in the 61st minute. In the third round was Vålerenga Fotball too strong, as Ull/Kisa lost 3–5 at Ullevaal Stadion. Eirik Soltvedt scored all the goals of Ull/Kisa.

In the middle of the 2010 season Arne Erlandsen was appointet by Ull/Kisa as their new coach. He saved the club from relegation to 3. divisjon this autumn, and decided to sign for another year.
2011 was a remarkable year for both Arne Erlandsen and Ull/Kisa. The Jessheim-club promoted to 1. divisjon for the first time in history. October 16, 2011 Ull/Kisa won 4–1 against Tiller IL, when Lørenskog IF at the same time played a 3–3 draw against KFUM Oslo, which meant that Ull/Kisa was five points ahead, with only one match left to play. The match against Tiller IL was the last game the club played at Jessheim Stadion.

Recent history 
{|class="wikitable"
|-bgcolor="#efefef"
! Season
! 
! Pos.
! Pl.
! W
! D
! L
! GS
! GA
! P
!Cup
!Notes
|-
|2006
|2. divisjon
|align=right |6
|align=right|26||align=right|10||align=right|9||align=right|7
|align=right|45||align=right|43||align=right|39
|First round
|
|-
|2007
|2. divisjon
|align=right|6
|align=right|26||align=right|10||align=right|6||align=right|10
|align=right|39||align=right|47||align=right|36
|First round
|
|-
|2008
|2. divisjon
|align=right |2
|align=right|26||align=right|16||align=right|7||align=right|3
|align=right|68||align=right|26||align=right|55
|Third round
|
|-
|2009
|2. divisjon
|align=right|10
|align=right|26||align=right|8||align=right|4||align=right|14
|align=right|49||align=right|53||align=right|28
|Third round
|
|-
|2010
|2. divisjon
|align=right |10
|align=right|26||align=right|9||align=right|5||align=right|12
|align=right|43||align=right|56||align=right|32
|First round
|
|-
|2011 
|2. divisjon
|align=right bgcolor=#DDFFDD| 1
|align=right|26||align=right|14||align=right|9||align=right|3
|align=right|59||align=right|38||align=right|51
|First round
|Promoted to the 1. divisjon
|-
|2012
|1. divisjon
|align=right |6
|align=right|30||align=right|14||align=right|2||align=right|14
|align=right|45||align=right|39||align=right|44
|Third round
|
|-
|2013 
|1. divisjon
|align=right |12
|align=right|30||align=right|9||align=right|7||align=right|14
|align=right|46||align=right|48||align=right|34
|Third round
|
|-
|2014 
|1. divisjon
|align=right bgcolor="#FFCCCC"| 15
|align=right|30||align=right|6||align=right|5||align=right|19
|align=right|26||align=right|51||align=right|23
||Third round
|Relegated to the 2. divisjon
|-
|2015 
|2. divisjon
|align=right bgcolor=#DDFFDD| 1
|align=right|26||align=right|18||align=right|4||align=right|4
|align=right|51||align=right|24||align=right|58
||Second round
|Promoted to the 1. divisjon
|-
|2016 
|1. divisjon
|align=right |12
|align=right|30||align=right|8||align=right|8||align=right|14
|align=right|47||align=right|50||align=right|32
||Second round
|
|-
|2017 
|1. divisjon
|align=right |6
|align=right|30||align=right|15||align=right|3||align=right|12
|align=right|61||align=right|55||align=right|48
||Third round
|
|-
|2018
|1. divisjon
|align=right |5
|align=right|30||align=right|11||align=right|10||align=right|9
|align=right|59||align=right|49||align=right|43
||Fourth round
|
|-
|2019 
|1. divisjon
|align=right |8
|align=right|30||align=right|11||align=right|6||align=right|13
|align=right|47||align=right|47||align=right|39
||Third round
|
|-
|2020 
|1. divisjon
|align=right |12
|align=right|30||align=right|10||align=right|5||align=right|15
|align=right|45||align=right|63||align=right|35
||Cancelled
|
|-
|2021 
|1. divisjon
|align=right bgcolor="#FFCCCC"| 15
|align=right|30||align=right|7||align=right|8||align=right|15
|align=right|34||align=right|50||align=right|29
||Second round
|Relegated to the 2. divisjon
|-
|2022
|2. divisjon
|align=right |2
|align=right|26||align=right|17||align=right|5||align=right|4
|align=right|73||align=right|36||align=right|56
||Third round
|
|}
Source:

Current squad

 

For season transfers, see transfers winter 2020–21.

References

External links
 Official homepage

 
Football clubs in Norway
Sport in Akershus
Ullensaker
Association football clubs established in 1894
Athletics clubs in Norway
1894 establishments in Norway